The Šarḥ ḏ-Zihrun Raza Kasia ("The Scroll of Zihrun, the Hidden Mystery") is a Mandaean religious text that describes rituals such as the masbuta, masiqta, and other related topics. It is an illustrated scroll.

Zihrun (referred to as Zihrun Raza Kasia or "Zihrun the Hidden Mystery" in full) is the name of an uthra.

Manuscripts and translations
An illustrated scroll was purchased by E. S. Drower from Shaikh Yahia at Qal'at Saleh, southern Iraq in May 1937. Today, it is held as manuscript 27 in the Drower Collection of the Bodleian Library at Oxford University, and is commonly abbreviated DC 27.

Bogdan Burtea translated the DC 27 manuscript into German in 2008, and also provided a detailed commentary as part of the published translation.

The scroll consists of pieces of paper that have been glued together and is approximately 691 cm long, of which 660 cm contain writing and illustrations. The scroll is about 30 cm wide, with 26 cm used for writing. There are 559 lines of writing. A scribal note in the manuscript says that the text was copied in 1088 A.H. (1677 A.D.).

Contents
The contents of the DC 27 scroll are:

Lines 1-22: Introduction
Lines 23-190: The baptism (masbuta) of Zihrun Raza Kasia
Lines 231-232: Illustrations, with explanations
Lines 191-231: Esoteric content
Lines 232-523: The masiqta of Zihrun Raza Kasia
Lines 524-559: Colophon

The masiqta of Zihrun Razia Kasia is performed for people who have died during one of the minor mbaṭṭal days (inauspicious days during which all rituals are forbidden), etc.

Ritual and prayer sequences

Below is the ritual and prayer sequence for both the Masiqta and Masbuta of Zihrun Raza Kasia in the Šarḥ ḏ-Zihrun Raza Kasia, as summarized in Burtea (2008). All prayer numbers, originally in Roman numerals, are from Part 1 (the Qolastā) of Mark Lidzbarski's Mandäische Liturgien (ML) unless otherwise specified (e.g., the Oxford Collection, which is Part 2 of Lidzbarski's Mandäische Liturgien, or CP, which is Drower's 1959 Canonical Prayerbook).

Masiqta of Zihrun Raza Kasia
Below is the ritual and prayer sequence for the Masiqta of Zihrun Raza Kasia as given in the text:

Summary of the prayer sequence listed above:

Masbuta of Zihrun Raza Kasia
Below is the ritual and prayer sequence for the Masbuta of Zihrun Raza Kasia as given in the text:

Ritual preliminaries

Baptism in the river

Oil drawing

The meal for the baptized

Priestly meal

Conclusion

Summary of the entire masbuta prayer sequence listed above:

See also
Scroll of Exalted Kingship
The Thousand and Twelve Questions
The Baptism of Hibil Ziwa

References

External links
Zihrun, das verborgene Geheimnis 

Mandaean texts
Mandaean rituals